Styra is a village and a former municipality on the island Euboea, Greece. Since the 2011 local government reform it is part of the municipality Karystos, of which it is a municipal unit. The municipal unit has an area of 188.583 km2. It is located in the southern part of Euboea, facing the eastern shore of Attica across the South Euboean Gulf. Nowadays it can be reached by ferryboat from the tiny harbor of Agia Marina, as well as by bridge from Chalcis.
Above the port there is a hill where the church of Saints Kostantine and Helen is situated with a panoramic view of the coast and Stouronisi (Styra Island).
Styra is a very popular destination for Athenians during the summer period.
After the collapse of the Iron Curtain, Albanians migrated into the area. The town takes its name from the ancient town of Styra.

History

Actually there are two towns, Nea Styra (New) and Palaia Styra (Old). The Nea Styra is a more modern tourist area with beautiful views, beaches, hotels, cafes, bookstores, nightclubs, shops, and bars. There are two doctors in Styra that share time between Nea Styra and Palaia Styra. In between Nea Styra and Palaia Styra is the ancient city of Styra, a city mentioned by Homer's Iliad (Rhapsody B). Ships left from the ancient city state of Styra to aid in the rescue of Helen of Troy.

Near Styra there are ancient structures standing which are 4,500 years old and are constructed using Megalithic Architecture. They are called Drakospita (i.e. dragon houses) and have been built using huge one piece stones (monoliths). The size of each of these stones is 4.0m length x 2.5m width x 1.5m height, similar to those found in the Philippines and at Stonehenge. Styra is a Arvanitika speaking community.

References

Populated places in Euboea
Karystos
Members of the Delian League
Arvanite settlements